KRKZ-FM is a radio station licensed to Chinook, Washington, serving the North Oregon and SW Washington coasts with a Top 40 (CHR) format.

External links

FCC application

Radio stations established in 2011
2011 establishments in Washington (state)
RKZ-FM
Contemporary hit radio stations in the United States